Lophis was a small stream of ancient Boeotia, near Haliartus, apparently the same as the Hopelites (Ὁπλίτης) of Plutarch, where Lysander fell in the Battle of Haliartus.

References

Geography of ancient Boeotia
Rivers of Greece